Marlene Steinberg M.D, is a researcher on Dissociation symptoms and disorders. She developed the pioneering: The Structured Clinical Interview for DSM-IV Dissociative Disorders (SCID-D) and wrote in conjunction with Maxine Schnall, The Stranger In The Mirror Dissociation - The Hidden Epidemic.

Dr Marlene Steinberg' conducted her research on dissociation at Yale University School of Medicine

Dr. Steinberg has opened a private practice in Naples, Florida offering intensive treatment for those suffering from dissociative disorders.

References

American women psychologists
21st-century American psychologists
Living people
Year of birth missing (living people)
21st-century American women